Jarett Andretti (born December 13, 1992) is an American racing driver from Charlotte, North Carolina. He is the son of IndyCar and NASCAR driver John Andretti, and the grandson of Aldo Andretti, the brother of Mario Andretti.

Racing career
Andretti began his career in sprint car racing in 2010, and moved onto Supermodified racing in 2012. Andretti won the 2016 Lawrenceburg Speedway track championship in his sprint car. He made one Rolex Sports Car Series start in 2012. He made his debuts in the USAC National Sprint Car, Silver Crown, and Midget scene in 2013, competing in those series through 2017. Andretti won the USAC National Sprint Car Rookie of the Year title in 2014.

He returned to sports car racing full-time in 2018, making 10 starts in the 2018 Pirelli World Challenge, while still competing in 24 USAC National Sprint Car races. In 2019, he raced in the 2019 GT4 America Series, driving a McLaren for Andretti Autosport in their first foray into the series. On April 12, 2019, it was announced that he would make his first Indy Lights start at the 2019 Freedom 100, also driving for Andretti Autosport.

In 2021, Jarett announced plans to race full-time in the IMSA Prototype Challenge in the LMP3 class, alongside teammate Tristan Herbert. He will race the No. 18 Ligier JS P320, with sponsors for his inaugural season including Gallant, Schaeffer Oil, and Unite Health Share Ministries. On May 5, Andretti Autosport announced they were moving the car from the Prototype Challenge to the IMSA WeatherTech SportsCar Championship, maintaining Andretti as driver of the re-numbered No. 36 car.

Personal life
Andretti graduated from North Carolina State University in 2015.

Motorsports career results

Complete IMSA SportsCar Championship results 
(key) (Races in bold indicate pole position; races in italics indicate fastest lap)

† Points only counted towards the Michelin Endurance Cup, and not the overall LMP3 Championship.

24 Hours of Daytona

American open-wheel racing results
(key)

Indy Lights

* Season still in progress

References

External links

1992 births
Living people
Jarett
Racing drivers from Indiana
Racing drivers from Indianapolis
24 Hours of Daytona drivers
Rolex Sports Car Series drivers
USAC Silver Crown Series drivers
Indy Lights drivers
North Carolina State University alumni
Andretti Autosport drivers
WeatherTech SportsCar Championship drivers